Dhimishiri is a village in Uttar Pradesh, India. It is located within the Agra district, the Fatehabad block, and the Dhimsiri Panchayat. It is about 25 km from Agra.

References 

Villages in Agra district